General Hughes may refer to:

Augusto Hughes (1931–1993), brigadier general in the Argentine Air Force 
Everett Hughes (general) (1885–1957), major general in the United States Army
Frederic Hughes (1858–1944), Australian Army general in the First World War
Garnet Hughes (1880–1937), major-general in the Canadian army during the First World War
Harley Hughes (born 1935) lieutenant general in the United States Air Force
Ivor Hughes (1897–1962), major general in the British Army during the Second World War
James D. Hughes (born 1922), lieutenant general in the United States Air Force
John H. Hughes (general) (1876–1953), major general in the United States Army
John T. Hughes (Confederate officer) (1817–1862), colonel in the Confederate Army in the American Civil War known as "General Hughes"; possibly promoted to brigadier general without documentation
Patrick M. Hughes (born 1942), lieutenant general in the United States Army
Robert Patterson Hughes (1839–1909), major general in the United States Army
Ronald Laurence Hughes (1920–2003), major general in the Australian Army during the Korean War
Sam Hughes (1853–1921), major-general in the Canadian militia, by self-promotion while serving as defence minister

See also
Attorney General Hughes (disambiguation)